Kostadin is a variant of Konstantin (Constantine). It may refer to:

Kostadin Adzhov (born 1991), Bulgarian footballer
Kostadin Alakushev, Bulgarian revolutionary in the Internal Macedonian-Adrianople Revolutionary Organization (IMARO)
Kostadin Angelov (born 1973), Bulgarian coach
Kostadin Bashov (born 1982), Bulgarian footballer
Kostadin Dyakov (born 1985), Bulgarian footballer
Kostadin Dzhambazov (born 1980), former Bulgarian footballer
Kostadin Gadzhalov (born 1989), Bulgarian footballer
Kostadin Georgiev (born 1986), Bulgarian footballer
Kostadin Hazurov (born 1985), Bulgarian footballer
Kostadin Katsimerski (born 1987), Bulgarian footballer
Kostadin Kostadinov (born 1959), retired Bulgarian football player
Kostadin Kostadinov (professor) (born 1955), Bulgarian scientist
Kostadin Markov (born 1979), Bulgarian footballer
Kostadin Stoyanov (born 1986), Bulgarian footballer
Kostadin Varimezov (1918–2002), famous Bulgarian bagpiper (gaidar)
Kostadin Velkov (born 1989), Bulgarian footballer
Kostadin Vidolov (born 1970), Bulgarian former footballer
Kostadin Yanchev (born 1963), Bulgarian former footballer
Kostadin Zelenkov (born 1977), Bulgarian football player

See also
Kostadinite

Bulgarian masculine given names